The Punjab State Super Football League, or simply the Punjab Super League, is an Indian top state-level regional league for men's football clubs. The league serves as the top football league in the state of Punjab and is sanctioned by Punjab Football Association. The league is currently sponsored by JCT Limited, thus making the official name JCT Punjab State Super Football League.

History
Started in 1986, the Punjab State Super Football League was started by the Punjab Football Association, however, during the early days, the league was played as a knock-out tournament which was played out for at least one week and thus the league was not granted "state league" status by the All India Football Federation till 2001. In 2001, the Punjab Football Association reformed the league to make it more into a league which would be played on a home and away basis. This thus earned the league its "state league" status.

In 2014, the Punjab State Super Football League was relaunched with JCT Limited as the title sponsors. The league would also now be played in a number of different cities to promote grassroots football and prize money would be given out to provide an incentive for teams in the league.

League structure
The Punjab football structure is based on two state level leagues, followed by the district leagues.

Teams

Current clubs

Former clubs

Champions 
The list of League champions:

References

 
Punjab
Football in Punjab, India